Rafael Assis may refer to:

 Rafael Assis (footballer, born 1990), Brazilian football midfielder
 Rafael Assis (footballer, born 1993), Brazilian football forward